Pandit Dattatreya Vishnu Paluskar (28 May 1921 – 26 October 1955), was a Hindustani classical vocalist. He was considered a child prodigy.

Early life and background
D.V. Paluskar was born in Nasik, Bombay Presidency to well-known Hindustani musician Vishnu Digambar Paluskar. His original surname was Gadgil, but as they hailed from the village Palus (near Sangli), they came to be known as the "Paluskar" family.

He was only ten years old when his father died, and was subsequently trained by Pandit Vinayakrao Patwardhan and Pandit Narayanrao Vyas. He was also trained by Pandit Chintamanrao Paluskar and Pandit Mirashi Buwa.

Career and life
D.V. Paluskar gave his debut performance at the Harvallabh Sangeet Sammelan in Punjab at the age of fourteen. He inherited the Gwalior gharana and the Gandharva Mahavidyalaya, but he was always open to adopting aesthetic features of other gharanas and styles.

He sung a duet with Ustad Amir Khan in the film Baiju Bawra. The only other film he sang for was a Bengali film called Shaap Mochan.

Death
He died from encephalitis on 26 October 1955. Mumbai, India

Discography
 List of D. V. Paluskar's  78 rpm recordings

References

External links
 D. V. Paluskar Page
 Extract from G.N. Joshi's "Down Melody Lane" (1984)
 Paluskar recordings on www.sarangi.info

Paluskar, D. V., Pandit
Paluskar, D. V., Pandit
Hindustani singers
People from Nashik
Gwalior gharana
20th-century Indian male classical singers
Singers from Maharashtra
20th-century Khyal singers